The 1801 Massachusetts gubernatorial election was held on April 6.

Federalist Governor Caleb Strong was re-elected to a second consecutive one-year term in office, defeating Democratic-Republican Elbridge Gerry.

General election

Results

References

Governor
1801
Massachusetts
April 1801 events